Margaret Icheen (born 26 June 1957) is a politician, an educationist and administrator, she was the first female speaker of a state House of Assembly in Nigeria and in Africa, and Minister of Special Duties and International Affairs, The Executive member of the Nigerian Football Federation (NFF).

Early life and education 
Icheen is from Kwande Local Government Area of Benue State. She attended two primary schhols, Our Udy Apostles Primary School Kaduna 1963 to 1965 and St Williams Primary School Keffi, 1966 to 1969, her secondary school at Gye Commercial College in Jos from 1970 to 1974. She then proceeded to Government Teachers College, Keffi, between 1975 and 1977. She furthered her education at the College of Education, Katsina-Ala, (An Affiliate of the University of Jos), from 1982 to 1985, to University of Calabar, and to the Institute of Christian Studies, Mkar from  1988- to 1990.

Career 
Icheen started her career as a teacher in a  Primary School, at the  Local Government Education Authority, LGEA, Adikpo from 1977 to 1981, and later became the Pay Mistress of the said school. Shwe was also a Principal at the Women Education Centre until 1993.

Political career 
Her Political career started in 1994  as the chairman (Ward Delegate) National Constitutional Conference in Adikpo under  the Social Democratic Party (SDP). Going further Icheen won the seat of Member Benue State House of Assembly 1993. She was the first woman to be elected as a speaker and in the house of Assembly in Benue state under the umbrella of People's Democratic Party (PDP) in fourth republic. In 2003 She was impeached from office due to the allegations pf funs misappropriation. She was a Member of the Benue State Constitution Electoral Review Committee,  North Central Speakers Forum, and also the National Coordinator, North Central/FCT, Women Participation in Politics in 2002.

Paper presentation 
As an edutionist, icheen National Union of Teachers, NUT.  Icheen also attended both National and International conferences  to represent Nigeria and PDP. Her first conference was the Benue State Delegate to the National Political Reform Conference in 2005. She was a Participant at the Commonwealth Parliamentary AssociationConferences held in Westminster, Abbey, Lndon,The African-Caribbean and Pacific Countries Conference held in Abuja, National Assembly Workshop on Espirit DeCorps and Strategies in Legislative Governance, all in 2000. Others were: Women in Leadership Training, San Francisco, USA,  African Parliamentary Conference and UNICEF Mission in Nouakchott, Mauritania, United States Orientation and Networking Trip of the Legislative Strengthening Programme in Jackson, Mississippi, USA, in 2001.

Awards 

 John F. Kennedy, Fellow Doctorate Award
 African-American International Research Institute, Kennedy University College, USA.
 International Woman of the Year  2000, by the United Kingdom Human Rights Organization. 
 Ambassador for PeaceAward, Inter-religious and International Federation for World Peace.
 WinningTeam Certificate of Excellence in Leadership by PDP 
 Women of Honour Award, Apples of Gold International.
 Merit Award for Outstanding performance in Politics.
 Club Recognition, by Rotary International Club of Makurdi.
 Excellent Award in Leadership by National Association of Women Journalists, NAWOJ.
 Justice of Knowledge, by Faculty of Law, BenueState University, Makurdi.
 Sheroes Award in sport

References

External links 
 https://www.subebbenuestate.net/subeblist.pdf

1957 births
Living people
People from Benue State
Nigerian women in politics
Peoples Democratic Party (Nigeria) politicians
21st-century Nigerian politicians
Nigerian political candidates